This is a list of legendary creatures from mythology, folklore and fairy tales, sorted by their classification or affiliation. Creatures from modern fantasy fiction and role-playing games are not included.

Animals, creatures associated with

Aquatic and marine mammals

Arthropods

Bats
 Balayang (Australian Aboriginal) – Bat-god and brother to Bunjil
 Camazotz (Mayan) – Bat spirit and servant of the lords of the underworld
 Leutogi (Polynesian) – Samoan princess rescued by bats
 Minyades (Greek) - Three sisters who refused to take part in the worship of Dionysus, and turned into bats by Hermes. 
 Tjinimin (Australian Aboriginal) – Ancestor of the Australian people
 Vetala (Hindu) – Vampiric entity that takes over cadavers.

Birds

Carnivorans

Bears
 Bugbear (Celtic) – child-eating hobgoblin
 Callisto (Greek) – A nymph who was turned into a bear by Hera.

Canines

Felines

Hyenas
 Werehyena
 Kishi – cannibalistic two-faced demon, half-human half-hyena (Africa)

Musteloids, mongoose and civets

Procyonids
Azeban  is a lower-level trickster spirit in Abenaki mythology. The traditional homeland of the Abenaki is Wobanakik (Place of the Dawn), what is now called northern New England and southern Quebec. Azeban (also spelled Azban, Asban or Azaban) is a raccoon, the Abenaki trickster figure. Pronounced ah-zuh-bahn. Azeban does many foolish and/or mischievous things in Abenaki folktales, but unlike animal tricksters in some other tribes, is not dangerous or malevolent.

Fish

Insectivores
 Lavellan A Lavellan, làbh-allan, la-mhalan or la-bhallan etc. is a mythological creature from northern Scotland. It was generally considered to be a kind of rodent, and indeed the name "làbh-allan" is also used for a water shrew or water vole in Scottish Gaelic. It was however, reportedly larger than a rat, very noxious, and lived in deep pools in rivers. Its poisonous abilities were legendary, and it was said to be able to injure cattle over a hundred feet away.

Marsupials
 Drop Bear
 Bunyip  (Australian Aboriginal)

Molluscs
 Akkorokamui – octopus monster (Ainu, Japan)
 Carbuncle (Chilote) – one of its many descriptions is a luminescent bivalve
 Kraken – squid monster (Worldwide)
 Shen (China)

Primates

Rabbits and hares

Reptiles, Limbed

Reptiles, Serpents and Worms

Rodents

Ungulates

Antelopes and deer

Bovines

Camelids
 Allocamelus – A donkey-headed camel.
 Heavenly Llama

Caprids

Equines

Pachyderms

See List of elephants in mythology and religion

Pigs and boars
 Calydonian Boar
 Erymanthian Boar
 Zhu Bajie

Xenarthrans
 Mapinguari

Megafauna
 see  List of megafauna in mythology and folklore

Giants
 see  List of giants in mythology and folklore

Artificial creatures
This listing includes creatures that are man-made, mechanical or of alchemical origins.

Body parts, creatures associated with

Blood

Bone
 Bloody Bones
 Gashadokuro
 Grim Reaper
 Skeleton

Eye

Face
 Asura
 Deva / Devi
 Noppera-bō

Hair
 Futakuchi-onna
 Harionago
 Mavka
 Medusa

Head

Limbs

Mouth
 Futakuchi-onna
 Kuchisake-onna

Skin
 Selkie
 Skin-walker
 Swan maiden

Tail
 Bakeneko
 Kitsune
 Yamata no Orochi
 Kumiho
 Hulder
 Nguruvilu

Neck

 Serpopard
 Rokurokubi
 Vampire

Torso

 Manananggal
 Geryon

Abdomen
 Pixiu

Concepts, creatures associated with

Battle, Vengeance, Violence, and War

Birth and Rebirth
 Phoenix
 Ubume

Death and Immortality

Dream, the Mind, and Sleep

Evil Eye and Sight

Fertility and Human Sexuality

Fortune, Luck, and Wealth

Light
Angel
Chalkydri
Deity
Lampetia
Will-o'-the-wisp
Dragon

Love and Romance

Sound
 Banshee
 Encantado
 Fenghuang
 Fossegrim
 Mermaid
 Nue
 Siren

Speech
Note: see Talking animal
 Gef
 Satan

Time and Technology
 Chronos
 Father Time
 Gremlin

Wisdom
 Baba Yaga
 Bai Ze
 Griffin
 Salmon of Wisdom
 Sphinx
 Valravn

Demons
 see list of theological demons

Elements, creatures associated with

Aether

Air and wind
 see  List of flying mythological creatures
 Ala
 Elemental
 Feldgeister
 Zduhać

Darkness

Earth and subterranean

Fire

Light and rainbow

Metal and gold

Thunder and lightning

Water

Habitats, creatures associated with

Cave and underground

Celestial and heaven

Desert

Temperate forest and woodland

Tropical forest and jungle

Temperate grassland and garden
 Fairy
 Gnome

Savanna
 Ennedi tiger
 Werehyena

Lake and river

Mountain and hill

Sea

Swamp and marsh

Volcano and lava
 Cherufe
 Phoenix
 Salamander

Polar, ice, and winter

Urban and house

Underworld and hell

Humanoids
see Mythic humanoids

Hybrids
see List of hybrid creatures

Astronomical objects, creatures associated with

Sun
 Chalkydri beings from the Second Book of Enoch
 Kua Fu a giant in China
 Three-legged bird in China, Japan
 Phoenix in Greek Mythology

Moon
 Jade rabbit
 Werewolf
 Werejaguar
 Alien

Constellation

World
 World Elephant
 World Tree
 World Turtle
See List of mythological places

Creatures associated with Plants

Shapeshifters
see List of shapeshifters

Creatures associated with Times

Day and diurnal

Night and nocturnal

Undead

 see also :Category:Ghosts and Ghosts in Hindu Mythology – Bhoot, Baital & Pishacha

Corporeal

Miscellaneous

References

 *
legendary creatures by types